Sultan is a position with several historical meanings. Sultan Hassan may refer to:

 Sultan an-Nasir Hasan, Mamluk sultan of Egypt (1347–1351, 1355-1361) and namesake of the Mosque-Madrasa of Sultan Hasan and Sultan Hassan Secondary School
 Sultan Hassan Farah, the 3rd Grand Sultan of the Isaaq Sultanate (1845 - 1870) and the father of Deria Hassan
 Sultan Hassan I of Morocco, Sultan of Morocco (1873–1894). King Mohammed V of Morocco (1927–1961), changed title of ruler from Sultan to King in 1957
 Sultan Hassan I of the Maldives, Sultan of the Maldives (1388–1398)
 Sultan Hassan II of the Maldives, Sultan of the Maldives
 Sultan Hassan III of the Maldives, Sultan of the Maldives (1443–1467)
 Sultan Hassan IV of the Maldives, Sultan of the Maldives (1480–1481)
 Sultan Hassan V of the Maldives, Sultan of the Maldives (1484–1485)
 Sultan Hassan Nooraddeen I, Sultan of the Maldives (1779–1799)
 Sultan Hassan Nooraddeen II, Sultan of the Maldives (1935–1943)
 Sultan Faiz-ul Hassan Shah, Pakistani Islamic scholar (1911–1984)
 Sultan Hassan (astrophysicist), contemporary Sudanese computational astrophysicist.